Timalus is a genus of moths in the subfamily Arctiinae.

Species
 Timalus caeruleus Hampson, 1898
 Timalus clavipennis Butler, 1876
 Timalus leucomela Walker, 1856

References

Natural History Museum Lepidoptera generic names catalog

Arctiinae